Scaphyglottis modesta is a species of orchid native to the Neotropics. Habitats it is found in include the Atlantic Forest ecoregion in southeastern Brazil.

References

External links

modesta
Orchids of Central America
Orchids of South America
Orchids of Brazil
Flora of the Atlantic Forest